Buchema nigra is a species of sea snail, a marine gastropod mollusk in the family Horaiclavidae. The scientific name of the species was first published in 2010 by Fallon.

Distribution
This marine species occurs in the tropical Northwest Atlantic Ocean.

References

 Fallon, Phillip J , Descriptions and illustrations of some new and poorly known turrids of the tropical northwestern Atlantic. Part 1. Genera Buchema Corea, 1934 and Miraclathurella Woodring, 1928 (Gastropoda: Turridae: Crassispirinae); Nautilus 124, 2010

nigra
Gastropods described in 2010